Naoki Yamamoto may refer to:

, Japanese manga artist
, Japanese racing driver